Korri may refer to:
 Korri, Iran, a village in Bushehr Province, Iran
 Kuri, ICT, Pakistan